The Ferești is a right tributary of the river Vaslui in Romania. It flows into the Vaslui in Moara Domnească.

References

Rivers of Romania
Rivers of Vaslui County